The Dressmaker is a 1988 British drama film directed by Jim O'Brien and starring Joan Plowright, Billie Whitelaw and Pete Postlethwaite. It is an adaptation of the 1973 novel The Dressmaker by Beryl Bainbridge.

Plot
Set during the Second World War in England, the story concerns a claustrophobic relationship between two middle-aged sisters and their fragile 17-year-old niece.

Cast
 Joan Plowright – Nellie 
 Billie Whitelaw – Margo 
 Pete Postlethwaite – Jack 
 Jane Horrocks – Rita 
 Tim Ransom – Wesley 
 Pippa Hinchley – Val 
 Rosemary Martin – Mrs Manders 
 Tony Haygarth – Mr Manders 
 Michael James Reed – Chuck  
 Sam Douglas – Corporal Zawadski 
 Bert Parnaby – Mr Barnes 
 Lorraine Ashbourne – Factory Girl 
 Mandy Walsh – Factory Girl 
 Margi Clarke – Shopwoman 
 Andrew Moorcroft – Butcher's Boy 
 Marie Jelliman – Mrs O'Toole

References

External links

1988 films
1988 drama films
Films scored by George Fenton
Films based on British novels
Films directed by Jim O'Brien
Films set in Liverpool
Films shot at Pinewood Studios
American World War II films
British World War II films
British drama films
1980s English-language films
1980s American films
1980s British films